Rowan Arumughan (born 7 September 1979) is an Indian professional football referee who officiates primarily in the I-League and Indian Super League. He has also officiated in FIFA matches.

References

External links
 
 

Living people
1979 births
People from Delhi
Indian football referees